Alum Bridge is an unincorporated community in Lewis County, West Virginia, United States. Alum Bridge has a post office with ZIP code 26321.

Alum Bridge was named for the local bridge over Alum Fork.

References

Unincorporated communities in Lewis County, West Virginia
Unincorporated communities in West Virginia